Jean Laurent Ravera (born August 29, 1979) is a Monegasque former swimmer, who specialized in sprint freestyle events. Ravera qualified for the men's 100 m freestyle at the 2004 Summer Olympics in Athens, by receiving a Universality place from FINA, in an entry time of 56.86. He challenged seven other swimmers in heat two, including three-time Olympian Aleksandr Agafonov of Uzbekistan. He rounded out the field to last place by five hundredths of a second (0.05) behind Iran's Babak Farhoudi in a lifetime best of 56.47. Ravera failed to advance into the semifinals, as he placed sixty-second overall out of 71 swimmers in the preliminaries.

References

1979 births
Living people
Monegasque male freestyle swimmers
Olympic swimmers of Monaco
Swimmers at the 2004 Summer Olympics